XHVZ-FM is a radio station on 97.3 FM in Cuernavaca, Morelos. It is owned by MVS Radio and carries the La Mejor grupera format.

History
XHVZ received its concession on March 28, 1980. 

Initially owned by Guadalupe Torres Vda. de Pérez Villanueva, it was bought by MVS in April 1986. Long a Stereorey station, it transitioned to Best FM along with almost all Stereorey stations in 2002 and then shifted to La Mejor upon its launch in 2005.

References

External links
MVS Radio Website

Radio stations in Morelos
MVS Radio